Douglas Dalton  (18 January 1913 – 28 July 1995) was a New Zealand rugby union player. He was educated at Nelson Park Primary School and then Napier Technical College. A prop and hooker, Dalton represented  at a provincial level, and was a member of the New Zealand national side, the All Blacks, from 1935 to 1938. He played 21 matches for the All Blacks including nine internationals. He later served as the Hawke's Bay selector between 1946 and 1949, and was also a North Island selector.

Active in the St John's Ambulance Association, Dalton was appointed as a Serving Brother of the Order of St John in 1966, and promoted to Officer of the same order in 1971. He was appointed a Companion of the Queen's Service Order for community service in the 1976 New Year Honours.

Dalton died in Napier on 28 July 1995, and was buried at Taradale Cemetery.

References

1913 births
1995 deaths
Rugby union players from Napier, New Zealand
New Zealand rugby union players
New Zealand international rugby union players
Hawke's Bay rugby union players
Rugby union hookers
Rugby union props
New Zealand sports executives and administrators
Officers of the Order of St John
Companions of the Queen's Service Order